Gordon McKay (1821–1903) was an American businessman and philanthropist.

Biography 
He was born in Pittsfield, Massachusetts. He was trained as an engineer, worked on a railroad, and then on the Erie Canal before he purchased a machine shop.  Around 1844 McKay established this business, which grew to employ over 100 men. He later met J.C. Hoadley, a future business partner who would become known for creating portable steam engines. Eventually the company became known as McKay and Hoadley,

In 1852, the workshop moved to the mill town of Lawrence, Massachusetts, where McKay eventually became the treasurer of the Lawrence Machine Shop.  He met Lyman Reed Blake, who had applied for, and received, a patent from the United States government for his sewing machine for helping attach the soles of shoes to the upper of the shoe.  This early sewing machine helped facilitate the production of low-cost shoes by eliminating the heavy work of hand sewing. Blake sold the patent to Gordon McKay a year afterwards for $8,000 in cash and a $62,000 share of future profits, and became an employee.  Blake worked for Mckay from 1861 to 1874. McKay improved Blake's rather cumbersome system, and with the advent of the American Civil War his Gordon McKay Shoe Machinery Company made large profits through the manufacture of much needed boots. McKay's most original idea was to lease the machinery rather than sell it outright, collecting a small royalty on each pair of shoes made with his equipment, and over the years he amassed considerable wealth.  By 1876, McKay was earning a staggering $500,000 per year in royalties.

In its licensing and royalty arrangements, McKay's company received the legal assistance of Gardiner Greene Hubbard, who later became the first president of the Bell Telephone Company.

Legacy 

McKay was not a graduate of Harvard, nor even of high school, but was a self-taught engineer and self-made businessman. The entrepreneur became close friends with Harvard geology professor Nathaniel Southgate Shaler, who would later become dean of the Lawrence Scientific School of Harvard in 1891. In 1893, McKay placed an initial $4 million in trust for Harvard.  Thanks to his own desire for the development of better training which would result in more thoroughly educated engineers, and Shaler's friendship and investment advice regarding gold, Gordon McKay left his estate to Harvard. Life trusts to his wife, Minnie, Minnie's two boys, and other young girls and women with whom he negotiated life trusts in exchange for sexual deviance, delayed the full transfer of the principal of the estate to Harvard until 1949. By then the total amounted to $16 million, the largest single gift received by the university until then and still one of the most generous so far when adjusted for inflation.

His legacy today supports over forty professorships in engineering and applied science, one of the most significant monetary contributions to academic salaries.  The terms of his will read, in part : "I direct that the salaries attached to the professorships maintained from the Endowment be kept liberal, generation after generation, according to the standards of each successive generation, to the end that these professorships may always be attractive to able men and that their effect may be to raise, in some judicious measure, the general scale of compensation for the teachers of the universities …” 

At Harvard, the Gordon McKay Laboratory for Applied Sciences is named for him. The professorships he endowed are within Harvard's School of Engineering and Applied Sciences.

Notes

References 

  
 Patten, William; Alexander Melville Bell. Pioneering The Telephone In Canada, Montreal: Herald Press, 1926. N.B.: Patten's full name was William Patten, not Gulielmus Patten as credited elsewhere.

1821 births
1903 deaths
People from Pittsfield, Massachusetts
Philanthropists from Massachusetts
19th-century American philanthropists